The Catephiini are a tribe of moths in the family Erebidae.

Taxonomy
The tribe is most closely related to the tribe Omopterini, also within Erebinae, though the genera belonging to each tribe are not well determined.

Genera

Catephia
Nagia
Paranagia

References

 
Erebinae
Moth tribes
Taxa named by Achille Guenée